Orchard Park may refer to:

Places

Canada
Royal Orchard Park in Markham, Ontario
Orchard Park Shopping Centre in Kelowna, British Columbia

United Kingdom
Orchard Park, Cambridgeshire (previously known as Arbury Park)
Orchard Park Estate, a council estate in Kingston upon Hull

United States
Orchard Park (town), New York, a suburb of Buffalo, New York
Orchard Park (village), New York, within the Town of Orchard Park
Orchard Park, Lancaster County, Pennsylvania
Orchard Park (Fremont County, Colorado)
Orchard Park (Omaha), a park in Omaha, Nebraska
Orchard Park (Oregon), a city park in Hillsboro, Oregon
Orchard Park, a section of the Roxbury neighborhood of Boston, Massachusetts
Orchard Park (neighborhood), Indiana, a neighborhood in Carmel, Indiana

Other
"Orchard Park" (song), a 2017 song by Aaron West and the Roaring Twenties